HMS Terpsichore was a T-class destroyer built for the Royal Navy during the Second World War.

Description
She was powered by two Parsons geared steam turbines, each driving one propeller shaft, using steam provided by two Admiralty three-drum boilers. Her complement was 170 officers and ratings.

The ship was armed with four 45-calibre 4.7-inch (120 mm) Mark XII guns in dual-purpose mounts. For anti-aircraft (AA) defence, Terpsichore had one twin mount for Bofors 40 mm guns and four twin  Oerlikon autocannon. She was fitted with two above-water quadruple mounts for  torpedoes. Two depth charge rails and four throwers were fitted for which 70 depth charges were provided.

Construction and career
In August 1945 Terpsichore was sent to Japan, under the command of Commander R.T. White D.S.O.** (later Captain R.T. White D.S.O.**, 2nd son of Sir Archibald White, Bt. of Wallingwells), as the lead destroyer in the escort group of the USS Mississippi (BB-41) into Tokyo Bay. Commander White witnessed the surrender of the Japanese Forces and received a surrendered Samurai sword from the Japanese.

Between 1946 and 1953 Terpsichore was held in reserve at Devonport. Between 1953 and 1954 she was converted to a Type 16 fast anti-submarine frigate, by Thornycroft, Woolston, with the new pennant number F19. In 1955 she was placed in reserve in Devonport, undergoing a refit there in December 1957. Between 1960 and 1966 Terpsichore was held in reserve at Lisahally. She was subsequently sold for scrap and arrived at Troon on 17 May 1966.

References

Bibliography

External links
 HMS Terpsichore on uboat.net
 HMS Terpsichore history on naval-history.net

 

S and T-class destroyers
Ships built on the River Clyde
1943 ships
World War II destroyers of the United Kingdom
Cold War destroyers of the United Kingdom
Type 16 frigates
Cold War frigates of the United Kingdom